Seven Swords is a 2005 wuxia film produced and directed by Tsui Hark, starring Donnie Yen, Leon Lai, Charlie Yeung, Sun Honglei, Lu Yi and Kim So-yeon. An international co-production between Hong Kong, China, South Korea and the Netherlands, the story is loosely adapted from Liang Yusheng's novel Qijian Xia Tianshan and is completely unrelated to the novel except for some characters' names. Seven Swords was used as the opening film to the 2005 Venice Film Festival and as a homage to Akira Kurosawa's 1954 film Seven Samurai.

Plot
In the mid-17th century, the Manchus conquer the territories of the former Ming Empire and establish the Qing Empire. While nationalistic sentiments start brewing within the wulin (martial artists' community), the Qing government immediately imposes a ban forbidding the common people from practising martial arts. The warlord Fire-Wind sees the new law as an opportunity to make a fortune so he offers to help the government execute the new rule. Greedy, cruel and immoral, Fire-Wind ravages northwest China with his army and kills thousands of resistance fighters and innocent civilians. His next goal is to attack Martial Village, which houses a large number of martial artists.

Fu Qingzhu, a retired executioner, feels an urge to stop Fire-Wind so he sets forth to save Martial Village. He brings with him two young villagers, Han Zhibang and Wu Yuanying, to Mount Heaven to seek help from Master Shadow-Glow, a reclusive swordsman and sword-forger. Shadow-Glow allows his four students – Chu Zhaonan, Yang Yuncong, Xin Longzi and Mulang – to accompany the trio on their quest. He also gives each of them a special sword he forged. The seven of them call themselves "Seven Swords". The Seven Swords return to Martial Village in the nick of time and successfully defeat and drive away Fire-Wind's soldiers. In order to buy time for the villagers to prepare for an evacuation, the Seven Swords head to Fire-Wind's base and cause damage by burning down their barn and poisoning their horses. During the raid, Chu Zhaonan encounters Fire-Wind's Korean slave girl, Green Pearl, and brings her along as they make their escape.

As the villagers evacuate Martial Village and make their way into the hills, strange things start happening along the way. Their food and water supplies are poisoned and their trail is marked by signs leading the enemy to them. The Seven Swords realise there is a spy among them and agree they must eliminate him/her before Fire-Wind catches up. Green Pearl immediately becomes the suspect because she does not speak their language. The situation is further complicated by a romantic affair between Chu Zhaonan and Green Pearl. At one point, Green Pearl and Chu fall into a trap set by Fire-Wind. Chu uses his sword to free Green Pearl from a net cast by Fire-Wind's men but loses his weapon. While Chu is captured by the enemy, Green Pearl manages to escape and convey her message that Chu has been captured to the other swordsmen before succumbing to her injuries.

The other six swordsmen travel to Fire-Wind's base and engage him in battle to rescue Chu Zhaonan. During the Seven Swords' absence, the spy, Qiu Dongluo, sets fire to the entrance to the cave to inform the enemy of the villagers' whereabouts. He reveals his identity and begins killing the unsuspecting villagers systematically. He is discovered by the village chief's daughter, Liu Yufang, who eventually kills him by accident. However, she is so traumatised by the experience that she becomes hysterical. Meanwhile, the Seven Swords defeat and slay Fire-Wind, and forces his army to retreat temporarily. The swordsmen return to the hideout, only to find that all the villagers have been killed, except for Liu Yufang and the children. Han Zhibang calms Liu down and decides to stay behind and protect the survivors. The Seven Swords realise the only way to save the wulin is to persuade the Qing emperor to withdraw the ban on martial arts. Liu tells Han that she can take care of the survivors alone so Han rushes to catch up with the other swordsmen as they travel towards the capital.

Cast

Donnie Yen as Chu Zhaonan, the wielder of the Dragon.
Leon Lai as Yang Yuncong, the wielder of the Transience.
Lau Kar-leung as Fu Qingzhu, the wielder of the Unlearnt.
Charlie Yeung as Wu Yuanying, the wielder of the Heaven's Fall.
Lu Yi as Han Zhibang, the wielder of the Deity.
Duncan Chow as Mulang, the wielder of the Celestial Beam.
Tai Li-wu as Xin Longzi, the wielder of the Star Chasers.
Sun Honglei as Fire-Wind, a warlord.
Kim So-yeon as Green Pearl, Fire-Wind's Korean slave girl.
Zhang Jingchu as Liu Yufang, Liu Jingyi's daughter and Han Zhibang's lover.
Ma Jingwu as Shadow-Glow, a reclusive swordsman and sword forger.
Michael Wong as Prince Dokado, a Manchu noble.
Jason Pai as Liu Jingyi, the village chief.
Chi Kuan-chun as Qiu Dongluo, the spy.
Huang Peng as Guan Sandao, a villager.
Zhang Chao as Zhang Huazhao, a villager.
Chen Jiajia as Kualo, Fire-Wind's follower.
Liu Mingzhe as Jiaoci, Fire-Wind's follower.
Li Haitao as Siyilang, Fire-Wind's follower.
Jiang Guangjin as Sanzi, Fire-Wind's follower.
Xie Zhang as Bald Lion, Fire-Wind's follower.
Wang Chi-man as Dagger Peak, Fire-Wind's follower.
Zhang Jie as Hair Wolf, Fire-Wind's follower.
Tang Tengfei as Stone Beast, Fire-Wind's follower.
Liu Zhenbao as Mud Trot, Fire-Wind's follower.
Lin Haibin as Sangen, Fire-Wind's follower.
Guo Fengqiang as Black Spirit, Fire-Wind's follower.
Jia Kun as Bangmuzi, Fire-Wind's follower.

Production

The film was the first of a planned six-part film franchise.

During the shooting of the ending fight scene, Donnie Yen accidentally injured Sun Honglei near the eye after mistakenly assuming that Sun was trained in martial arts. Sun was rushed from Xinjiang to a hospital in Beijing on the night of 7 December. His eyesight was not affected so he returned to the set a day later and insisted on finishing his scenes.

Casting

The role of Chu Zhaonan was initially offered to Korean actor Song Seung-heon at a reported salary of US$400,000. Director Tsui Hark recruited Leon Lai to portray Yang Yuncong after watching his performance in The Sword of Many Loves and wanting to "see another side of him". Song and Lai were trained in horse riding and swordplay for their respective roles but Song dropped out near the start of the filming period to work on other projects. Donnie Yen was then offered to play Chu Zhaonan, and he accepted the offer without hesitation after "understanding the gravity" of the situation.

Lu Yi, who portrayed Han Zhibang, once said that he would never act in wuxia or martial arts films again. However, when he saw the all-star cast tied to the project, he immediately accepted the offer to join because he felt it was a rare opportunity for him to work with such a strong cast.

The role of Prince Dokado was initially offered to Hu Jun, who rejected it for reasons unknown. It was later offered to Wang Xueqi, who similarly turned down the offer. The role eventually went to Michael Wong.

Release
Cheung Chi-sing, the production manager and scriptwriter, revealed that the initial cut made by Angie Lam was four hours long. However, the distributors were worried that such a lengthy running time would limit screening arrangements and affect box office performance, so Tsui re-edited it to two versions – 150 minutes and 120 minutes. After finding that the 120 minutes version suffered from underdevelopment, the investors chose the 150 minutes version for the theatrical run.

Reception
Seven Swords was well received in Asia, being nominated for many awards in both Hong Kong and China. Its US limited-release received generally negative reviews and holds a 25% "rotten" rating on Rotten Tomatoes based on 15 reviews.

Sequel and Reboot
Tsui Hark intended Seven Swords to be a heptalogy and confirmed a sequel script was in progress. Although confirming a sequel was in the works, a completed script, and ready to be filmed at the end of 2006, the movie was never completed. By 2019, a new seven swords trilogy was made unrelated to Tsui Hark's work.

See also
Qijian Xia Tianshan
Seven Swordsmen

References

Seven Swords related news on wu-jing.org

External links

Seven Swords (archived from the original on 2007-02-16)
Review of Seven Swords on kfccinema.com

2005 films
Hong Kong action films
Hong Kong martial arts films
Hong Kong epic films
South Korean action films
South Korean martial arts films
South Korean epic films
Chinese action films
Chinese martial arts films
Chinese epic films
Dutch action films
2005 action films
2005 martial arts films
Wuxia films
Films directed by Tsui Hark
Films based on works by Liang Yusheng
Films set in the Qing dynasty
Films scored by Kenji Kawai
2000s Hong Kong films
2000s South Korean films
2000s Chinese films
2000s Mandarin-language films